Courtney Marsh is an  American film director best known for her documentary Chau, Beyond the Lines for which she received an Academy Award for Best Documentary (Short Subject) nomination at the 88th Academy Awards, with Jerry Franck.

Filmography
 Chau, Beyond the Lines (2015)
 Zari (2014)
 The Tulip Chair (2014) 
 Amuse Bouche (2009)

Awards and nominations
 2015: Academy Awards - Best Documentary - Short Subject
 2015: Austin Film Festival – Grand Jury Award – Best Documentary Short Film
 2015: USA Film Festival –  National Jury Award – Documentary Short Film
 2015: Fort Lauderdale International Film Festival – Grand Jury Award – Best Documentary Short Film
 2016: Irvine International Film Festival - Grand Jury Award - Best Documentary Short Film

References

External links
  
 
 Courtney Marsh at Vimeo 

American documentary filmmakers
Marsh, Courtney
University of California, Los Angeles alumni
Living people
Year of birth missing (living people)